Sharp is a lunar impact crater located to the west of the Sinus Iridum bay of the Mare Imbrium, beyond the Montes Jura range. To the southwest is the crater Mairan. Because of its location and foreshortening, Sharp appears elliptical from the earth.

Sharp is surrounded by a rugged region of mountains and rises. Ridges are joined to the north and south ends of the rim. The crater has a low central peak at the midpoint of the floor. Between Sharp and Sharp A is an unnamed sinuous rille. The more distant Rima Sharp is located on the Mare Frigoris to the northwest.

Satellite craters
By convention these features are identified on lunar maps by placing the letter on the side of the crater midpoint that is closest to Sharp.

References

 
 
 
 
 
 
 
 
 
 
 
 

Impact craters on the Moon